Distant Sounds of Summer is a collaborative studio album by Susumu Yokota & Rothko, released on Lo Recordings in 2005. It features vocal contributions from Caroline Ross. It peaked at number 37 on the UK Independent Albums Chart.

Track listing

Personnel
Credits adapted from liner notes.
 Susumu Yokota – music, production
 Mark Beazley – music, production
 Caroline Ross – lyrics, vocals
 Denis Blackham – mastering
 Richard Green – photography
 Non-Format – art direction, design

Charts

References

External links
 Distant Sounds of Summer at Lo Recordings
 

2005 albums
Collaborative albums
Susumu Yokota albums